Cecilie Gotaas Johnsen (born 20 April 1976) is a Norwegian former professional road cyclist and footballer. She competed in the 2013 UCI women's road race in Florence. She won the Norwegian National Road Race Championships in 2013.

In 2022, Gotaas Johnsen was appointed the chairwoman at Norwegian professional football club Rosenborg BK. She had previously played 17 Toppserien games for Sportsklubben Trondheims-Ørn in the 1990s, prior to their merger with Rosenborg BK to form Rosenborg BK Kvinner.

Major results
Source:

2012
 Tour Cycliste Féminin International de l'Ardèche
1st Prologue & Stage 1
 National Road Championships
2nd Time trial
8th Road race
 6th Chrono des Nations
 8th Team time trial, UCI Road World Championships
2013
 National Road Championships
1st  Road race
2nd Time trial
 3rd Overall Tour of Zhoushan Island
1st Points classification
1st Mountains classification
1st Stages 2 & 3
 9th Open de Suède Vårgårda TTT
2014
 National Road Championships
2nd Road race
3rd Time trial
 6th Chrono des Nations
 9th Chrono Champenois-Trophée Européen
 10th Tour of Chongming Island World Cup
2015
 National Road Championships
1st  Time trial
2nd Road race
 9th Chrono des Nations
 10th Overall The Princess Maha Chackri Sirindhon's Cup
2016
 2nd Time trial, National Road Championships
 4th Ljubljana–Domžale–Ljubljana TT
 5th Chrono des Nations
 10th Chrono Champenois
2017
 9th Overall Tour of Thailand

References

External links

Interview: Cecilie Gotaas Johnsen, podiumcafe.com

1976 births
Living people
Norwegian female cyclists
Norwegian women's footballers
Sportspeople from Trondheim
Cyclists at the 2015 European Games
European Games competitors for Norway
SK Trondheims-Ørn players
Norwegian University of Science and Technology alumni
Women's association footballers not categorized by position
21st-century Norwegian women